The Gymnasium München Nord is a Gymnasium in the Munich city district Milbertshofen-Am Hart. It has languages, mathematics and science specialisms and trains a quarter of its students at a national level in a competitive Olympic sport. The school is located at the former US army Alabama Depot area.

Description
The school has a capacity of 100 teachers and 900 students. It was founded in 2016, built and operated following the principles of Rainer Schweppe. The school was seen as a group of year groups each having its own open plan multifunctional area, surrounded by the individual classrooms that those students would mainly use. Collapsing classes into larger didactic units was encouraged. It operated on a all-day use principle with student attending in the afternoon for additional reading time. Homework was done on site where teachers were available to assist. Students in the specialist stream may have a timetabled lesson then in one of their additional subjects.
The school operates as a Eliteschule des Sports. One out of four of the students is trained for national and international Sport Competitions. The school has a calisthenics park, a beach volleyball court and a 40 meter long boulder wall.

School trips

Architecture 
The building is on a 30 ha site that was part of the US Army Alabama Depot and then the Alabama Halle next to BMW Research and Innovation Centre. THe site was landscaped by Hackl Hoffmann. The building was designed and built by the architects h4a Gessert + Randecker . The footprint of the building is 18.000 m², the useable area being 10.000 m².
It cost in all 65 millioneuro, and Freistaat Bayern contributed 8 million euro.

Public Art

As part of the German Kunst am Bau scheme the School hosts two artworks, Feuer & Flamme by the sculptor, from Bruno Wank, and Stefan Wischnewski's Auf die Plätze.

References

External links 

Official Website (de)

Gymnasiums in Germany
Schools in Munich
Educational institutions established in 2016
Milbertshofen-Am Hart
2016 establishments in Germany